Avo Kiir (born 23 February 1952 in Mäetaguse) is an Estonian Lutheran clergyman and politician. He was a member of VII Riigikogu.

References

Living people
1952 births
Estonian Lutheran clergy
Estonian National Independence Party politicians
Members of the Riigikogu, 1992–1995
Recipients of the Order of the White Star, 4th Class
Recipients of the Order of the National Coat of Arms, 4th Class
People from Alutaguse Parish